Desmond Bishop (born 12 November 1975) is an American-Irish comedian. He was brought up in Ireland and moved to New York at the age of 14. He primarily resides there.

Early life 
Bishop attended St. Francis Preparatory School in the Fresh Meadows neighbourhood of the New York City borough of Queens. At the age of 16, he began school at St Peter's College, Wexford in Ireland. He later re-sat his Leaving Certificate at Blackrock College, Dublin. He has a degree in English and history from University College Cork.

Career
Bishop has worked as a comic in Ireland since the late 1990s. He began hosting shows and honing his act at the International Comedy Cellar, a venue set up by Irish comics such as Ardal O'Hanlon, Kevin Gildea, and Barry Murphy.

Bishop appeared in the 2002 film In America, in which he played a high stockbroker rapping in the back of a New York taxi cab.

He reached a broader audience after his TV show The Des Bishop Work Experience screened on RTÉ Two in 2004. The show featured him attempting to survive for one month working a minimum wage job in various parts of Ireland. During the series, he worked at Abrakebabra, Waterford; The Aqua-dome, Tralee; Superquinn, Dundalk; and the Central Hotel, Dublin.

A more recent TV show, named Joy in the Hood, featured him travelling to deprived areas of Ireland's major cities and mentoring local people in stand-up comedy.

Bishop speaks fluent Mandarin Chinese and has also worked in China where he has adopted the Chinese stage name Bi Hansheng (毕瀚生) and has appeared in a few Chinese dating shows.

In 2017, Bishop took part in the first series of the Irish version of Dancing with the Stars. He was partnered with Italian dancer, Giulia Dotta. They were eliminated in the sixth week of the competition, finishing in eighth place.

Personal life
Bishop's brother Aidan works as a comedian in Ireland. Both are involved in running the International Comedy Club.

His father died from lung cancer in February 2011, and on 19 March 2019, his mother Eileen died at the age of 77, after a long illness.

In February 2021, Bishop became engaged to Hannah Berner, a main cast member on the reality television series Summer House. They married at Bishop's home in The Hamptons in New York State on 13 May 2022.

Bishop's comedy has covered social issues, such as poverty. After being diagnosed with testicular cancer in 2000, Bishop turned his experiences into comedy material.

Irish language
Bishop's TV show, In the Name of the Fada premiered in 2008. It chronicles Bishop's undertaking to learn Irish to a level sufficient to perform a stand-up act in the language. During this period he achieved fluency in the language. He later used his Irish-language skills to sing the Gaeilge version of the song "Jump Around" called Léim Thart.

The DVDs of his live show Tongues and of the series In the Name of the Fada were released on 14 November 2008.

Works

Standup DVDs

Des Bishop - Live at Vicar Street (2003)
Des Bishop - Live (2005)
Des Bishop - Fitting In (2006)
Des Bishop - Tongues (2007)
Des Bishop - Desfunctional (2009)

Book
My Dad Was Nearly James Bond (2011)

References

External links
 Official website
 New York Times interview
 

1975 births
Living people
Alumni of University College Cork
American male comedians
Irish emigrants to the United States
American stand-up comedians
Irish male comedians
Irish stand-up comedians
Irish television personalities
People educated at Blackrock College
People from Flushing, Queens
People from County Galway
People from County Wexford
Comedians from New York (state)
People educated at St Peter's College, Wexford
21st-century American comedians